The North Lawrence–Monroe Street Historic District was a  historic district in Montgomery, Alabama.  It comprised 132–148, 216, and 220 Monroe Street and 14, 22, 28–40, and 56 North Lawrence Street, containing a total of six contributing buildings.  These buildings were significant in that they housed African American businesses during the era of segregation, making this a commercial center for African Americans in Montgomery.  The businesses played a supporting role during the Montgomery bus boycott in 1955–1956 by providing dispatch and pick-up services.  The district was placed on the National Register of Historic Places on August 30, 1984.  The entire block was subsequently demolished in the mid-1990s to allow construction of a parking deck for the RSA Tower.

See also
National Register of Historic Places listings in Montgomery County, Alabama

References

National Register of Historic Places in Montgomery, Alabama
Historic districts in Montgomery, Alabama
African-American history in Montgomery, Alabama
Former National Register of Historic Places in Alabama